Andrew Service (born 29 March 1961) is a Hong Kong sailor. He competed in the men's 470 event at the 1996 Summer Olympics.

References

External links
 

1961 births
Living people
Hong Kong male sailors (sport)
Olympic sailors of Hong Kong
Sailors at the 1996 Summer Olympics – 470
Place of birth missing (living people)